David Greig may refer to:

 David Greig (supermarket), a supermarket chain of the Greig family of Hornsey, north London
 David Greig (landowner) (1837–?), Scottish landowner
 David Greig (dramatist) (born 1969), Scottish playwright and theatre director
 David Greig (MP), British Member of Parliament for Perth 1839–1841
 David Cunningham Greig (1922–1999), British geologist
 David Middleton Greig (1864–1936), Scottish surgeon

Greig, David